Guoge is Chinese for "the national anthem".

It may refer to:

 "The March of the Volunteers", long the provisional and since 1982 the official national anthem of the People's Republic of China
 The National Anthem of the Republic of China
 The National Anthem (film), a 1999 film about the composition of "The March of the Volunteers"
 The National Anthem (series), a 27-episode drama on the composition of the Chinese national anthem
 "The East Is Red" (song), an unofficial anthem during the late 1960s and early 1970s amid the PRC's Cultural Revolution
 Other historical Chinese anthems
 Other countries' national anthems